Allen D. Eldridge is a game designer who has worked primarily on board games.

Career
Allen Eldridge met Stephen Cole at a local game club in Amarillo, Texas, and joined Cole at his company JP Productions a few years after he founded it in 1973. Cole and Eldridge decided to close down JP in November 1976, and the company shut down in spring of 1977. In the fall of 1978, Cole and Eldridge co-founded Task Force Games which they used to sell only to wholesalers and retailers and not to individuals. After Eldridge got a line on inexpensive boxes, Task Force was able to release Star Fleet Battles in a regular-sized and boxed second edition. After Cole left Task Force in 1983 to form his new company, the Amarillo Design Bureau, Eldridge stayed with Task Force. In April 1988, Eldridge sold Task Force Games to New World Computing.

References

Board game designers
Living people
Year of birth missing (living people)